Rolando Corella Agüero (born June 26, 1972 in Atenas) is a retired Costa Rican footballer.

Club career
Corella scored a goal in the 1992/93 championship playoff against Cartaginés, which won Herediano the league title. He left Herediano in 1998 for Santa Bárbara and later had a spell abroad with Salvadoran outfit FAS, scoring 3 goals in the 17-0 rout of Nicaraguans Jalapa in the 2002 Copa Interclubes UNCAF.

In January 2004 he left Municipal Grecia for Santos de Guápiles.

References

External links
 

1972 births
Living people
People from Atenas (canton)
Association football forwards
Costa Rican footballers
C.S. Herediano footballers
A.D. San Carlos footballers
C.D. FAS footballers
Belén F.C. players
Santos de Guápiles footballers
A.D. Carmelita footballers
Costa Rican expatriate footballers
Expatriate footballers in El Salvador
Liga FPD players
Municipal Grecia players